Freeman Aikaeli Mbowe (born 14 September 1961) is a Tanzanian politician and current chairman of Chama cha Demokrasia na Maendeleo. 

He was elected as a National Assembly member representing the Hai District in the Kilimanjaro Region as from 2010 to 2020.

Mbowe was elected to the National Assembly in 2000 representing Hai Constituency (Kilimanjaro Region). He won 64.5% of the vote, which was the highest percentage of votes won among constituencies with opposition MP's.

In preparation for the 2005 elections, Mbowe was nominated to represent Chadema as their presidential candidate for the 2005 presidential elections. Jumbe Rajab Jumbe, a Zanzibari was chosen as his vice-presidential candidate. The election was originally scheduled for 30 October 2005, but was postponed until 14 December due to the death of Jumbe.

Mbowe constructively criticized the lengthy postponement, saying a week's delay would have sufficed and that his political party cannot afford to finance extra campaigns. Chadema eventually settled on Anna Komu to be the running political party executive.

He placed third out of ten candidates in the presidential election of 14 December 2005, winning 5.88% of the vote.
In the 2010 general elections, he was elected as a member of parliament for The united republic of Tanzania parliament after winning against the experienced candidate the incumbent from Mapinduzi, Fuya Godwin Kimbita taking 51.63% of the vote. 

One of the founders of Chadema in 1992, Mbowe is a good strategist which makes him currently one of the main strategists of the Chadema political party and a main executive board member in the political party to ensure the political growth of his party, of which he has steadily led as chairman since 2004, in a healthy politically competitive environment that has witnessed a steady collapse of major opposition parties since the 1990s at the hands of the CCM government.

In July 2021, Freeman Mbowe, was arrested along with ten other members of the party left for Mwanza (north-west) where they were planning a rally. The state eventually accused him of terrorism. He remains in remand prison as his charges are unbailable in Tanzania.

In March 2022, Tanzania prosecutors drop terrorism case against him

References

1961 births
Living people
Chadema MPs
Tanzanian MPs 2010–2015